Deman (also, Diman and Dyman) — is a village in the Yardymli Rayon of Azerbaijan.  The village forms part of the municipality of Avaş.

Notable natives 
  
 Georgi Limanski — mayor of Samara (1997–2006).

References 

Populated places in Yardimli District